= Four flats =

Four flats may refer to:

- A-flat major, a major musical key with four flats
- F minor, a minor musical key with four flats
- Flat-four engine, a type of piston engine
